Paishachi or Paisaci is a largely unattested literary language of the middle kingdoms of India mentioned in Prakrit and Sanskrit grammars of antiquity. It is generally grouped with the Prakrits, with which it shares some linguistic similarities, but is still not considered a spoken Prakrit by the grammarians because it was purely a literary language, and because of its archaicism.

Identity
The etymology of the name suggests that it is spoken by piśācas, "ghouls". Evidence which lends support to the former interpretation is that literature in Paiśācī is fragmentary and extremely rare but may have been once common.

The Siddha-Hema-Śabdanuśāśana a grammar treatise written by Rev. Acharya Hemachandraacharya includes six languages: Sanskrit, the "standard" Prakrit (virtually Maharashtri Prakrit), Shauraseni, Magahi, Paiśācī, the otherwise-unattested Cūlikāpaiśācī and Apabhraṃśa (virtually Gurjar Apabhraṃśa, prevalent in the area of Gujarat and Rajasthan at that time and the precursor of Gujarati language).

The 13th-century Tibetan historian Buton Rinchen Drub wrote that the early Buddhist schools were separated by choice of sacred language: the Mahāsāṃghikas used Prākrit, the Sarvāstivādins used Sanskrit, the Sthaviravādins used Paiśācī, and the Saṃmitīya used Apabhraṃśa.

Literature
The most widely known work, although lost, attributed to be in Paiśācī is the Bṛhatkathā (literally "Big Story"), a large collection of stories in verse, attributed to Gunadhya. It is known of through its adaptations in Sanskrit as the Kathasaritsagara in the 11th century by Somadeva, and also from the Bṛhatkathā by Kshemendra. Both Somadeva and Kshemendra were from Kashmir where the Bṛhatkathā was said to be popular.

Talking of its existence, Pollock writes:
There is one chapter dedicated to Paisachi Prakrit in Prakrita Prakasha, a grammar book of Prakrit languages attributed to Vararuchi.

In this work, it is mentioned that the base of Paisachi is Shauraseni language. It further goes on to mention 10 rules of transforming the base text to Paisachi. These are mostly rules of substitution of letters - Chapter 10 of Prakrita Pariksha

See also
Pali

References

Indo-Aryan languages
Extinct languages of Asia
Prakrit languages